The Johansen Expressway (formally, the Woodrow Johansen Expressway) is a  expressway in Fairbanks, Alaska. The Johansen Expressway serves as a northern bypass to the city, and is notable for being the only highway in Alaska to have exit numbers.

History
Named the Geist Road Extension for most of its planning period, the highway was named in 1988 in honor of Hendryx Woodrow "Woody" Johansen (1913–1991). Johansen was a professor of civil engineering at the University of Alaska Fairbanks, and an employee of the Alaska Road Commission and the Alaska Department of Highways. As northern district engineer for the Department of Highways, he envisioned and designed the system of expressways which was built in the Fairbanks area between the 1970s and 1990s.

Route description
The Johansen Expressway is a four- to six-lane expressway in Fairbanks. Most of the expressway is built with four lanes of traffic and the capability to upgrade to six lanes. The expressway begins as a continuation of Geist Road at an intersection with University Avenue near the University of Alaska Fairbanks campus. From this point it continues east as a four-lane expressway, passing through an interchange with Peger Road, providing access to commercial districts along Airport Way to the south. Johansen Expressway continues east, passing through an intersection with Danby Street, a major connection to residential areas to the north, and through a major interchange with College Road, providing a connection with Downtown Fairbanks and other outlying commercial and residential districts. After passing through two intersections leading to commercial developments, the Johansen Expressway ends at the Steese Highway, an old gold-rush route that leads to the town of Circle to the north.

Exit list

See also

References

Transportation in Fairbanks North Star Borough, Alaska
State highways in Alaska
Expressways in the United States